Pine Creek Township may refer to:

 Pine Creek Township, Ogle County, Illinois
 Pine Creek Township, Ozark County, Missouri, in Ozark County, Missouri
 Pine Creek Township, Clinton County, Pennsylvania
 Pine Creek Township, Jefferson County, Pennsylvania

Township name disambiguation pages